Paul Laurence Dunbar High School, is a public high school in Baltimore, Maryland, United States.

History
In 1918, Paul Laurence Dunbar High School opened around the corner from its present location as the Paul Laurence Dunbar Elementary School, No. 101. The original school was part of the segregated "colored schools" system, which was abolished by 1954. The present school is part of the Baltimore City Public Schools system. It was named in memory of Paul Laurence Dunbar, a famous African-American poet, who had died twelve years before the school opened. In 1925, it was renamed Dunbar Junior High School, No. 133. In 1940, Dunbar became a high school and awarded its first diploma, the second school for African-Americans in Baltimore to do so.

In the summer of 2007, after thirty years of heavy use, the main high school building was emptied for renovations. Students were moved to Thomas G. Hayes Elementary School, behind Dunbar at 601 North Central Avenue. The renovations were completed in late August 2009 with costs totaling $32 million. Renovated features included science and robotics labs, wider interior hallways, larger windows, a new cafeteria, and a new library.

Academics
Dunbar High School is a magnet school, offering biotechnology, emergency medical technology (EMT), accounting, nursing, and health care delivery systems programs. Dunbar High School has been named a Bronze Medal School by U.S. News & World Report.

Athletics
The male varsity sports offered at Dunbar are baseball, basketball, football, soccer, and wrestling. The women's varsity sports offered are badminton, basketball, soccer, softball, and volleyball. The four varsity teams that are coed are cross country, swimming, indoor track and field, and outdoor track and field.

Football
The Baltimore City Public Schools withdrew from the Maryland Scholastic Association (MSA) in 1993, its long-time home since 1909 and the home of the formerly segregated schools, Dunbar and Douglass, since 1956. The schools then joined the larger, statewide Maryland Public Secondary Schools Athletic Association (MPSSAA), and since then Dunbar has had great success in the class 1A division. The Dunbar football team, the Poets, won state championships in 1994, 1995, 2004, 2006, 2007, 2008, 2012, 2013, 2017 and 2021.

Basketball
Since 1993, the school's basketball team, the Poets, have won the State Championship fifteen times. Additionally, the Poets were National Champions in 1983, 1985 and 1992. Dunbar's girls basketball team, the Lady Poets, have excelled as well, winning the state girls basketball title in 2000, 2001, 2002, 2003, 2011 and 2012.

Community partnerships
Dunbar is one of the partner schools of Thread, formerly the Incentive Mentoring Program, an organization formed by Johns Hopkins School of Medicine that tutors high school students to help prevent them from failing high school.  Struggling students selected by the principal can receive one-on-one tutoring from Thread mentors, as well as social support to address any personal challenges that may be affecting their school performance.

Notable alumni

Business and industry
 Reginald F. Lewis, Chairman & CEO, TLC Beatrice Foods International

Politics and government
 Robert M. Bell, Chief Judge, Maryland Court of Appeals
 Clarence "Tiger" Davis, Maryland House of Delegates, District 45 (1983–2007)
 Ken Harris, Baltimore City Council, District 4

Music
 Tupac Shakur, rapper and actor(9th grade only)
 Ultra Nate, musician (class of 1986)

Film and Television

 D. Watkins , New York Times Bestselling author, HBO writer

Sports

NFL
 Calvin Williams, former wide receiver, Philadelphia Eagles; associate athletics director, Purdue University
 Tommy Polley, linebacker, St. Louis Rams, New Orleans Saints, Baltimore Ravens
 Bob Wade, defensive back, Washington Redskins
 Tavon Austin, wide receiver, Dallas Cowboys
 Delano Johnson, defensive lineman, Houston Texans

NBA
 Muggsy Bogues
 Sam Cassell
 Kurk Lee
 Reggie Lewis
 Reggie Williams
 David Wingate
 Skip Wise
 Keith Booth
 Terry Dozier

Coaches
Keith Booth, former Assistant Coach of University of Maryland at College Park Terrapins men's basketball team, current men's assistant at Loyola University Maryland
Bob Wade, Head Coach, University of Maryland at College Park Terrapins men's basketball team, also Dunbar's boys basketball team Poets, first African-American head basketball coach in the Atlantic Coast Conference
Sam Cassell, current assistant coach of the Philadelphia 76ers NBA men's professional basketball team

References

External links
 Official website
 Paul Laurence Dunbar High School - Maryland Report Card

African-American history in Baltimore
East Baltimore
Educational institutions in the United States with year of establishment missing
Magnet schools in Maryland
Middle States Commission on Secondary Schools
Public high schools in Maryland
Public schools in Baltimore